Hussein Ali Dakik (born 10 November 1988) is a Lebanese professional footballer who plays as a full-back for  club Ahed.

Personal life 
On 27 August 2020, Dakik tested positive for COVID-19; he fully recovered on 3 September.

Honours 
Ahed
 AFC Cup: 2019
 Lebanese Premier League: 2009–10, 2010–11, 2014–15, 2016–17, 2017–18, 2018–19, 2021–22
 Lebanese FA Cup: 2017–18, 2018–19
 Lebanese Elite Cup: 2010, 2011, 2013, 2015, 2022; runner-up: 2021
 Lebanese Super Cup: 2011, 2015, 2017, 2018, 2019
Awards

 Lebanese Premier League Team of the Season: 2009–10, 2010–11, 2011–12, 2015–16, 2018–19

References

External links

 
 
 
 

1988 births
Living people
Lebanese footballers
Lebanon international footballers
Association football fullbacks
Shabab Al Sahel FC players
Al Ahed FC players
Lebanese Premier League players
AFC Cup winning players